Paula Mitrache (born 14 June 1977), known by the stage name Haiducii, is a Romanian-Italian singer, model and actress. She released her debut single "Dragostea din tei" in 2004, a cover of O-Zone's homonymous single of the previous year. A copyright infringement lawsuit followed on the matter and resulted in Haiducii paying fees for this confirmed charge. Commercially, "Dragostea din tei" reached widespread commercial success, reaching number 1 in Austria, Italy, Portugal and Sweden, as well as the top ten in eight other countries. It was also certified Gold and Platinum in several territories. In late 2004, Haiducii released "Mne s Toboy Horosho" and, in late 2005, "More 'N' More (I Love You)", her last singles that managed to hit the chart, reaching numbers 5 and 8 in Italy, respectively. Paula Mitrache in Haiducii, the singer's debut studio album, followed in 2008, which includes these first hit songs.

Discography

Studio albums

Singles

Filmography

Official Haiducii Videos

Haiducii – Dragostea din tei (Original version)
Haiducii – Dragostea din tei (Gabry Ponte Remix)
Haiducii – I need a boyfriend
Haiducii – Mne S toboy horosho (Gabry Ponte Remix)
Haiducii – More 'n' More (I love you)

Haiducii Live Videos

Haiducii – Dragostea din tei (CD Live, Italy)
Haiducii – Dragostea din tei (Competition, France)
Haiducii – Dragostea din tei (France)
Haiducii – More 'n' More (I love you) (Italy)
Haiducii – Dragostea din tei (Italy)
Haiducii – Maria Maria (Germany)

References

External links 
Paula Mitrache Official Myspace

1977 births
Living people
Musicians from Bucharest
Romanian beauty pageant winners
Romanian dance musicians
Romanian women pop singers
Romanian emigrants to Italy
21st-century Romanian singers
21st-century Romanian women singers
Women in electronic music